Blues with a Feeling is the 11th studio album by Steve Hackett, released in 1994. As the title denotes, Hackett explored his feelings about blues music.

Track listing (UK Version)
"Born in Chicago" – 3:58
"The Stumble" – 2:55
"Love of Another Kind" – 4:00
"Way Down South" – 4:29
"A Blue Part of Town" – 3:04
"Footloose" – 2:30
"Tombstone Roller" – 5:18
"Blues with a Feeling" (Little Walter Jacobs) – 4:23 
"Big Dallas Sky" – 4:48
"The 13th Floor" – 3:29
"So Many Roads" – 3:16
"Solid Ground" – 4:28

On June 24, 2016, Esoteric Recordings (a Cherry Red Records label) released a remastered version of the album, adding two new bonus tracks that were recorded specifically for this release: "On Cemetery Road" (3:07), and "Patch of Blue" (4:37).

Personnel
 Steve Hackett - guitars, harmonica, vocals 
 Doug Sinclair - bass
 Julian Colbeck - keyboards
 Hugo Degenhardt - drums
Guests musicians 
 Dave "Taif" Ball - bass on "Love of Another Kind" and "Way Down South"
 Jerry Peal - organ on "Love of Another Kind"
 John Chapman - baritone saxophone on "Footloose", "Tombstone Roller" and "Blues with a Feeling"
 Pete Long - tenor saxophone on "Footloose", "Tombstone Roller" and "Blues with a Feeling"
 John Lee, Matt Dunkley - trumpet on "Footloose", "Tombstone Roller" and "Blues with a Feeling"

Production 
 Recorded By : Chris Deam, Gerry O'Riordan, Jerry Peal 
 Mixed by : Jerry Peal 
 Producer : Steve Hackett

References

 Personnel : https://www.discogs.com/Steve-Hackett-Blues-With-A-Feeling/release/4254938

1994 albums
Steve Hackett albums